Chibombo  is a town in the Central Province of Zambia, and is headquarters of Chibombo District. The town lies near the Lukanga Swamp. It is 95 km north of Lusaka and 45 km south-west of Kabwe on the Great North Road.

Chibombo is home of the Lukanga swamp,  a wetland in Central Zambia which for hundreds of years has supported indigenous
people. The people of Chibombo have built their livelihood and cultural identities based on the ecosystem services it provides.

References

General references
 Google Earth

Populated places in Central Province, Zambia